Drago Matanović was the author of numerous books and textbooks on electrical engineering published in Slovene from the 1930s to the 1950s.

In 1951 he won the Levstik Award for his book Pogled v elektrotehniko (A Look at Electrotechnics).

Published works

 Elektrotehnika (Electrotechnics), 1933
 K vprašanju gospodarske razsvetljave (On the Question of Economical Lighting), 1935
 O ceni električne energije s posebnim ozirom na razsvetljavo (On the Price of Electricity Particularly in Respect to Lighting), 1944
 Od elektrarne do žarnice: čitanka o elektrotehniki za mlade in stare (From the Power Plant to the Light Bulb: A Textbook on Electrotechins for Young and Old), 1949
 Splošna elektrotehnika: I del: Osnove (General Electrotechnics: Volume I: The Basics), 1950
 Pogled v elektrotehniko (A Look at Electrotechnics), 1951
 Zaščitne mere v električnih napravah (Protective Measures in Electrical Appliances, 1951
 Splošna elektrotehnika: II del: Stroji in meritve'' (General Electrotechnics: Volume II: Equipment and Measurements), 1952

References 

Levstik Award laureates
Slovenian electrical engineers
Yugoslav engineers